Alleyn-et-Cawood is a municipality in the Outaouais region, northwest of Gatineau, part of the Pontiac Regional County Municipality, Quebec, Canada. Its main population centre is Danford Lake, located along Route 301.

Elected in 2013, the mayor of the municipality is Carl Mayer.

History
The municipality is named after the 2 geographic townships that it covers. The Township of Cawood was established in 1861, and named after Cawood in England (first used on a map by Gale and Duberger in 1795 and misspelled as Cadwood for a while). The Township of Alleyn, established in 1864, was named in honour of Charles Joseph Alleyn, a lawyer and politician of Quebec.

The United Township Municipality of Cawood-et-Alleyn was formed in 1876 when it split off from the United Township Municipality of Thorne-Cawood-et-Alleyn (which became the Municipality of Thorne). In 2004, the united township municipality of Alleyn-et-Cawood became the Municipality of Alleyn-et-Cawood.

Danford Lake
In 1855, the area's first settler was Patrick Danford, after whom the lake and community are named. He was followed by loggers and other settlers, notably William Heeney and his family in 1861. His descendants contributed much to the growth and development of the community. In 1868, the post office opened in Danford Lake, and in 1902, its first general store.

Demographics

Language

Commerce
Local businesses include:
Magasin TL
Lyndale Gardens
Roger Johnson's Garage

Local government

Alleyn-et-Cawood forms part of the federal electoral district of Pontiac and has been represented by Sophie Chatel of the Liberal Party since 2021. Provincially, Alleyn-et-Cawood is part of the Pontiac electoral district and is represented by André Fortin of the Quebec Liberal Party since 2014.

List of former mayors:

 Joseph Squitti (2001–2009)
 Charlene Scharf-Lafleur (2009–2013)
 Carl Mayer (2013–present)

See also
 List of municipalities in Quebec

References

External links

Incorporated places in Outaouais
Municipalities in Quebec